In mathematics, the Valentiner group is the perfect triple cover of the alternating group on 6 points, and is a group of order 1080.

All perfect alternating groups have perfect double covers. In most cases this is the universal central extension.  The two exceptions are A6 (whose perfect triple cover is the Valentiner group) and A7, whose universal central extensions have centers of order 6.

Representations

The alternating group A6 acts on the complex projective plane, and  showed that the group acts on the 6 conics of Gerbaldi's theorem. This gives a homomorphism to PGL3(C), and the lift of this to the triple cover GL3(C) is the Valentiner group. This embedding can be defined over the field generated by the 15th roots of unity.
The product of the Valentiner group with a group of order 2  is a 3-dimensional complex reflection group of order 2160 generated by 45 complex reflections of order 2. The invariants form a polynomial algebra with generators of degrees 6, 12, and 30.
The Valentiner group has  complex  irreducible faithful group representations of dimension 3, 3, 3, 3, 6, 6, 9, 9, 15, 15.
The Valentiner group can be represented as the monomial symmetries of the hexacode, the 3-dimensional subspace of F spanned by (001111), (111100), and (0101ω), where the elements of the finite field F4 are 0, 1, ω, .
The  group PGL3(F4) acts on  the 2-dimensional projective plane over F4 and acts transitively on its hyperovals (sets of 6 points such that no three are on a line). The subgroup fixing a hyperoval is a copy of the alternating group A6. The lift of this to the triple cover GL3(F4) of PGL3(F4) is the Valentiner group.
 described the representations of the Valentiner group as a Galois group, and gave an order 3 differential equation with the Valentiner group as its differential Galois group.

References

Finite groups